A Fête Worse Than Death: A Journey through an English Summer is a travel book by Iain Aitch. It was written in the summer of 2002 when the author took a trip around England to see what made the English act so strangely in the summer.

The book was initially published by Review in 2003 and then in paperback in 2004.

British travel books
2003 non-fiction books
English non-fiction books